Superdrag is an American alternative rock band from Knoxville, Tennessee, United States. They are best known for their 1996 single, "Sucked Out", off their album Regretfully Yours, for which a video was played on MTV. The original lineup reunited in 2007, releasing a full-length album in 2009: Industry Giants. The same lineup reunited again in 2021.

Career

Early years (1992–1995)
Superdrag formed in the early 1990s when Knoxville guitar player Brandon Fisher began dating the cousin of John Davis. Davis, a bit younger than Fisher, began playing the drums in Brandon's band, The Used (posthumously renamed The Used to Be for a 2003 re-release, and not to be confused with the Utah-based emo band), along with Tom Pappas, also Davis's senior by a couple of years.

After a relatively unsuccessful stint under that arrangement, a friend of the band named Don Coffey Jr. overheard Davis play a few songs he had written on the guitar and began playing drums with them. Soon after, Pappas switched from his guitarist role to become the band's bass player, Fisher resumed on the lead guitar, and Superdrag was born. Davis and Coffey Jr. also played with fellow Knoxvillian Mike Smithers in 30 Amp Fuse, but left that band when Superdrag became successful.

Elektra years (1996–1999)
The band released three vinyl singles and their first CD EP, The Fabulous 8-Track Sound of Superdrag in 1995, and after having one of their A-sides ("Señorita") on a CMJ comp, soon released their first proper full-length, Regretfully Yours in 1996 after attracting the attention of Elektra Records. Their first single, "Sucked Out," was played frequently on MTV and the radio, but it would be their only mainstream hit; as a result, they were soon classified as a one-hit wonder. The video clip to the single "Destination Ursa Major" on the same album was Superdrag's second and last video to make it to television.

They were given more financial support from Elektra to record their next album. The product was 1998's Head Trip in Every Key, which included Davis playing theremin, piano, sitar, organ.  It was co-produced with the band by Jerry Finn.

It is believed by many that the intent of the band was to go purposely against Elektra's will with the overall sound of the album. Davis himself has admitted that they were taking advantage of the money Elektra provided to them in order to create the best studio album they could regardless of the label's demands for radio hits, knowing that Superdrag would probably never have that kind of funding again. Only one song, "Do the Vampire", received even minimal radio play and, as expected, Elektra Records subsequently cut most of the band's funding. Almost no touring was done in support of the album, and it remains unheard by many.

The same thing happened to their fellow labelmates Nada Surf, with whom they had toured in July 1996, after the release in 1998 of their second LP, The Proximity Effect.

After hearing what Superdrag had in store for their next release (and at the band's request, as well), Elektra dropped the band from their label before they were even finished recording their third full-length album. Pappas left the band to pursue his own career (notably with his three-piece Flesh Vehicle and as a sideman in live performance with Bloodshot's Bobby Bare, Jr.), and the band moved out east to sign with Arena Rock Recording Co., the New York-based label that put out their "N.A. Kicker" 7-inch single before Elektra came into the picture (they had also earlier dealt with another indie label, Darla).

Arena Rock Recording Company years (2000–2003)
By 2000 they had taken on a new bassist, Sam Powers, and released their third full-length album, In the Valley of Dying Stars, as produced by long-time friend Nick Raskulinecz with help from Don Coffey Jr, who was beginning to show a keen interest in life on the other side of the glass. In the Valley of Dying Stars is by far the most emotional and raw of all of their albums; and, musically, in stark contrast to Head Trip'''s diverse instrumentation, Dying Stars kept to the standard rock format: guitar, drums, bass. The emotional core of Dying Stars emanates from the death of Davis's grandfather (his namesake), to whom John had been very close and had admired dearly. Davis' feelings on the record industry also emerged in songs such as "Keep it Close to Me":

I want rock and roll, but I don't want to deal with the hassle. I know what I know, but I don't want to feel like an asshole.

With the absence of a major label or producer to influence their sound—although Raskulinecz was originally committed to the project, he had just signed on to produce an album for Foo Fighters in Los Angeles—Superdrag continued to evolve at their own pace, and in 2002 Last Call for Vitriol once again redefined the band's sound. Some of the songs moved toward a heavier, more alternative sound, while others were of pure Americana influence. Brandon Fisher had left the band prior to the release of In the Valley of Dying Stars, and Mic Harrison had eventually taken his place, adding a much more Americana feel to the guitar style.  Prior to Harrison's arrival, guitarist William Tyler, now an acclaimed solo artist, toured with the band.

Breakup
Davis had turned heavily to alcohol in prior years and many of his songs were about that very topic. One night, before the release of their last album, while driving to his parents' house, Davis pulled his truck over to pray, feeling that he had finally hit rock-bottom. He described the experience as life-changing, as he stated he felt a definite answer to his prayer. He was able to get away from alcohol, but felt that Superdrag was a mouth-piece for the life he had left behind, and simply didn't feel his heart behind it anymore.  Upon completion of touring for Last Call, the band disbanded, playing one last show for Boston's NEMO music industry conference at The Paradise Rock Club on September 5, 2003; the show was documented with a Clear Channel-produced two-disc release" Instant Live: The Paradise.

Solo projects
Coffey is presently pursuing a career in recording and producing, operating Independent Recorders in Knoxville, Tennessee and organizing an annual multi-day rock festival, Hottfest, "Donnie Hott" being an inner-circle nickname for the drummer. Powers joined Guided By Voices as a fill-in bassist for their final European tour, returning to his pre-Superdrag job at Sony Music Publishing in Nashville and starting a family; a solo album is in the works from Powers. Harrison remains in Knoxville as a solo artist, with former bandmate Coffey in his backing band, often playing live shows with Knoxville rockers The High Score. Pappas plays bass and shares lead vocal duties in the Nashville rock group WHIP!.

Davis, too, is continuing as a performer. Davis released a gospel-influenced, spiritually-centered album—John Davis—in 2005, then switched gears with an aggressive rock album, 2007's Arigato!. He has also become a session musician, most notably with Allison Moorer, which led to European touring and an appearance on The Tonight Show with Jay Leno. He also plays guitar for The Astronaut Pushers, who released their debut album in 2005.

Reunion (2007–2010)
In July 2007, 6 reunion shows were announced, scheduled for October and November 2007. These shows featured the original lineup of Davis, Coffey, Fisher, and Pappas playing mostly from the first two Superdrag LPs, as well as one track from Davis' latest solo album.

In December 2007, two new demo tracks were posted on Superdrag's MySpace page, hinting at a new album in the future.

On January 8, 2008, John Davis announced on the Superdrag news section that the band is reunited indefinitely, stating that "Superdrag's original line-up will reconvene in the recording studio in February to begin work on our first new recording project together since 1998's Head Trip in Every Key." Also revealed was the fact that Superdrag will be co-headlining with Nada Surf on April 11, 2008, at Terminal 5 in NYC.

On March 8, 2008, Superdrag visited Lake Fever Productions in Nashville and recorded four songs for the upcoming album with Jason Bullock and Joe Colvert.

On October 15, 2008, Davis announced a new album, Industry Giants, which was released on March 17, 2009.  After a U.S. tour in the spring of 2009 and other dates following, Superdrag again became inactive after a performance of May 22, 2010 in tribute to the recently deceased Big Star frontman Alex Chilton.  Earlier in the month, Davis joined the surviving members of Big Star during a show at the Levitt Shell in Memphis; two of the songs performed, "In The Street" and "Don't Lie To Me", were later released as a 7-inch single.  Pappas continues with Flesh Vehicle, Rock City Birdhouse, and Senator Pappas & The Assassins; Davis, Pappas, and Sam Powers played in Warthog, a Ramones tribute band; and Davis has been most prolific as a member of the punk band Epic Ditch.

In late 2012, bass player Tom Pappas released his first solo record: 20 years of the Senator. He has been performing live as The Tom Pappas Collection with Andy Herrin of the band Cavo and *repeat repeat on drums.

In 2013, Davis, Fisher and Epic Ditch drummer Nick Slack formed a shoegaze act, The Lees of Memory, who released their debut single on the Pittsburgh label Velocity of Sound. Superdrag's debut album, Regretfully Yours, was given its first ever vinyl issue by SideOneDummy Records that February. In a fall 2013 interview with the blog BrightestYoungThings to promote The Lees of Memory's first single, Davis said that a vinyl issue of Head Trip in Every Key was planned. In the same interview, Davis confirmed that Superdrag had disbanded permanently.

In July 2014, SideOneDummy announced the vinyl release of Head Trip in Every Key along with Jokers W/ Tracers, a set of demos and rarities, which were released in August 2014. The label also signed The Lees of Memory for their debut album, Sisyphus Says, which was released in September 2014.  The Lees have since formed a live lineup including Powers on bass, and will play the 2015 South by Southwest festival.

Starting in August 2014, Davis has posted several albums of demos on a Bandcamp account called "High Bias!!! A Cassette-Based Operation ™." These include the demos Davis made for Head Trip in Every Key through Industry Giants, as well as those for his solo albums and The Lees of Memory.

Davis and Fisher have since released additional recordings as part of The Lees of Memory, including 2016's Unnecessarily Evil 2017's double-album The Blinding White Of Nothing At All and 2020's Moon Shot. Davis released a one-off collaboration, "We Are In the Wild and We Are Home", with Matthew Caws.

Second reunion (2021–present)
In late 2021, the band began posting regularly on social media; among their posts included recent photos of the original lineup of Davis, Fisher, Pappas, and Coffey. In January 2022, the band confirmed that they are working on new music and that November entered the studio with Raskulinecz.

Members
 John Davis – vocals, guitar (1992–2003, 2007–2010, 2021–present)
 Don Coffey Jr. – drums (1992–2003, 2007–2010, 2021–present)
 Brandon Fisher – guitar (1992–2000, 2007–2010, 2021–present)
 Tom Pappas – bass (1992–1999, 2007–2010, 2021–present)
 Sam Powers – bass (1999–2003)
 Mic Harrison – guitar (2001–2003)
 William "Willie T." Tyler – guitar (2000)

Discography

Tribute albums
 A Tribute to Superdrag'' (2006 - Double D Records)

References

External links
  [link broken]
 Superdrag at the Live Music Archive
 [ Allmusic entry for Superdrag]
 Superdrag at Arena Rock Recording Co.
 BYT: interview
 Superdrag article
 John Davis Interview - Ground Control Magazine - 5.5.09

Alternative rock groups from Tennessee
Arena Rock Recording Company artists
Musical groups from Knoxville, Tennessee
American pop rock music groups
Elektra Records artists
Darla Records artists
Vagrant Records artists